The Algodoneros de Guasave are a professional baseball team in the Mexican Pacific League based in Guasave, Sinaloa.  They won the league championship in 1972.

The team was purchased in April 2014 by a group of investors led by Armando Navarro. The team was moved to Guadalajara and began play in the 2014-15 season as the third incarnation of the Charros de Jalisco.

On January 27, 2019, during a rally at the Estadio Francisco Carranza Limón in Guasave, Mexican President Andrés Manuel López Obrador announced that the Algodoneros would return to compete in the Mexican Pacific League beginning in the 2019–20 season as a new franchise. The original one is today the Charros de Jalisco. This new version of the Algodoneros would be one of two additions to the LMP, with the Sultanes de Monterrey (who also play in the Mexican Baseball League) being the other.

References

Algodoneros de Guasave
Baseball teams established in 1965
Sport in Guasave
Sports teams in Sinaloa
1965 establishments in Mexico